Mexicana Universal Hidalgo is a pageant in Hidalgo, Mexico, that selects that state's representative for the national Mexicana Universal pageant.

In 2003, 2004, 2005, 2006, 2007, 2009 and 2010 was not sent to a State Representative.

The State Organization hasn't had a national winner in Nuestra Belleza México. In 1994 was the only occasion in which the state is placed in the semifinals.

Titleholders
Below are the names of the annual titleholders of Mexicana Universal Hidalgo, listed in ascending order, and their final placements in the Mexicana Universal after their participation, until 2017 the names was Nuestra Belleza Hidalgo.

 Competed in Miss Universe.
 Competed in Miss International.
 Competed in Miss Charm International.
 Competed in Miss Continente Americano.
 Competed in Reina Hispanoamericana.
 Competed in Miss Orb International.
 Competed in Nuestra Latinoamericana Universal.

External links
Official Website

Nuestra Belleza México